Dimitrie Robert Popa (born 5 March 2003) is a Romanian professional footballer who plays as a goalkeeper for Liga I club FC U Craiova.

Club career
Popa made his Liga I debut for FC U Craiova on 26 September 2021, in a 1–1 draw at Botoșani.

Honours
FC U Craiova
Liga II: 2020–21

References

External links

Robert Popa at Liga Profesionistă de Fotbal 

2003 births
Living people
Sportspeople from Râmnicu Vâlcea
Romanian footballers
Association football goalkeepers
Liga I players
Liga II players
Liga III players
FC Argeș Pitești players
FC U Craiova 1948 players
Romania youth international footballers
Romania under-21 international footballers